A tactical event (Also known as a "Private Battle" in the United Kingdom and elsewhere) is a type of historical reenactment, not usually open to the public, which is fought like a real battle with each side devising strategies and tactics to defeat their opponent(s). Tactical events have no script, a basic set of agreed-upon rules (physical boundaries, time limit, victory conditions, etc.), and onsite judges or referees, and so could be considered a form of live action role-playing game or wargame. Tactical battles might also be considered a form of experimental archaeology.

Notes

References
 Hadden, Robert Lee. Reliving the Civil War: A reenactor's handbook. Mechanicsburg, PA: Stackpole Books, 1999.

Military reenactment 
Historical reenactment by type
Live-action role-playing games
Historically themed events